Esperance Airport  is an airport in Esperance, Western Australia.

Airlines and destinations 

Qantas and Virgin Australia Regional Airlines previously operated flights from Esperance to Perth.

See also
 List of airports in Western Australia
 Aviation transport in Australia

References

External links

Esperance Airport – official website
Airservices Aerodromes & Procedure Charts

Airports in Western Australia
Goldfields-Esperance